thttpd (tiny/turbo/throttling HTTP server) is an open source software web server from ACME Laboratories, designed for simplicity, a small execution footprint and speed.

Design and features  
thttpd is single-threaded and portable: it compiles cleanly on most Unix-like operating systems, including FreeBSD, SunOS 4, Solaris 2, BSD/OS, Linux, and OSF/1. It has an executable memory size of about 50 kB.
While it can be used as a simplified replacement to more feature-rich servers, it is uniquely suited to service high volume requests for static data—for example as an image hosting server. The first "t" in thttpd stands for variously tiny, turbo, or throttling.

thttpd has a bandwidth throttling feature which enables the server administrator to limit the maximum bit rate at which certain types of files may be transferred.  For example, the administrator may choose to restrict the transfer of JPEG image files to at most 20 kilobytes per second.  This prevents the connection from becoming saturated so that the server will still be responsive under heavy load, with the tradeoff that file transfer speed is reduced. thttpd did not support the X-Forwarded-For header

Forks 
There are at least 2 public forks of thttpd:
 sthttpd by Anthony Basile, focusing on Gentoo Linux patches
 Merecat by Joachim Nilsson, adding a number of features, most notably SSL support

See also 
 Comparison of web server software
 Embedded HTTP server
 NanoHTTPD

References

External links 
 thttpd web site
 Description of throttling in thttpd documentation
 thttpd, unofficial resources (links, patches, etc.)
 thttpd AT mail.acme.com mailing list archive at http://marc.info
 Connection throttling patch

Free software programmed in C
Free web server software
Cross-platform free software
Unix network-related software
Software using the BSD license